The 13th Pan American Games were held in Winnipeg, Manitoba, Canada from July 23 to August 8, 1999.

Medals

Silver

Women's 50m Freestyle: Eileen Coparropa

Bronze

Men's – 69 kg: Alexis Batista

Results by event

Swimming

Weightlifting

See also
 Panama at the 2000 Summer Olympics

References

Nations at the 1999 Pan American Games
1999 in Panamanian sport
1999